Samuel H. Weaver (July 10, 1855–February 1, 1914), was an American Major League Baseball pitcher who played from  to . He played for the Philadelphia White Stockings, Milwaukee Grays, Philadelphia Athletics, Louisville Eclipse, and Philadelphia Keystones.

References

External links

1855 births
1914 deaths
Major League Baseball pitchers
Baseball players from Pennsylvania
Milwaukee Grays players
Philadelphia Athletics (AA) players
Louisville Eclipse players
Philadelphia White Stockings players
Philadelphia Keystones players
19th-century baseball players
Philadelphia Athletic players
Milwaukee (minor league baseball) players
Worcester Grays players
Philadelphia Athletics (minor league) players